Six Mile Lake or Sixmile Lake may refer to:

In Canada
 Six Mile Lake (Nova Scotia)
 Six Mile Lake (Ontario)
 Six Mile Lake Provincial Park, on the above lake

In the United States
 Six Mile Lake (Alaska)
Sixmile Lake (Colorado)
 Six Mile Lake (Michigan)
Sixmile Lake (Dickinson County, Michigan)
Sixmile Lake (Antrim County, Michigan)
Sixmile Lake (Minnesota)
Sixmile Lake (South Dakota)
Sixmile Lake (Oregon)

References
Michigan  Streamflow Data from the USGS

See also
 Lake Buel, Massachusetts, once known as Six Mile Pond